Progressive realism is an American foreign policy paradigm largely made popular by Robert Wright in 2006 which focuses on producing measurable results in pursuit of widely supported goals.  It supports stronger international institutions, free trade, and U.S. national interests.  Progressive realists' beliefs stand in stark contrast to those of neoconservatives. Unlike neoconservatives, progressive realists highlight the importance of strong participation in the United Nations and acquiescence to international law. They assert that international security, economic interdependence, and environmentalism enable international governance to advance national interests.  The policy emphasizes the need to convert "hard" power and "soft" power into "smart" power.

References 

Foreign policy doctrines of the United States
Progressivism in the United States
Political realism